Phra Ramesuan Stadium is a multi-purpose stadium in Lopburi Province, Thailand. It is currently used mostly for football matches and is the home stadium of Lopburi. It is named after the king of ayutthaya, King Ramesuan.

References

Multi-purpose stadiums in Thailand
Buildings and structures in Lopburi province
Sport in Lopburi province